Bumper Offer is a 2009 Telugu-language action comedy romance film  directed by Jaya Ravindra. The film stars Sairam Shankar and Bindu Madhavi. The music of the film was composed by Raghu Kunche. The film released on 23 October 2009. Puri Jagannadh produced this film apart from writing the story and the dialogues. The movie was a commercial success.

Plot
Sai completes his education and wastes his time. He refuses to marry as her mother Ramanamma wanted to put some responsibility on him. Sai"s father Rao is a clerk with a real estate firm run by Surya Prakash.

Once, Surya Prakash"s daughter Aiswarya breaks the leg of Sai mistaking him to be someone who tried to tease her. This makes him lose his heart to Aiswarya. After a few turn of events, Aiswarya too falls flat for Sai. But this irks Surya Prakash who tried to thrash both Rao and Sai black and blue. Aiswarya reaches the spot and warns that she would shoot herself if any harm is done to them.
Surya Prakash budges to the situation and gives an offer to Sai to earn at least five per cent value of his assets and marry Aiswarya. But the latter refuses the offer saying that he is giving another bumper offer to Surya Prakash that he would make him lose his entire property and assets and pull him down to the earth and make him equal to their family to catch the hand of Aiswarya.

What plans did Sai make to make Surya Prakash bankrupt? What happens to the love between Sai and Aiswarya? Who is Mallikarjun and what kind of help or harm did he do to Sai? Did Sai emerge victorious in teaching a lesson to Surya Prakash? Answers to all these questions form part of the climax.

Cast

 Sairam Shankar as Sai
 Bindu Madhavi as Aishwarya
 Sayaji Shinde as Surya Prakash, Aishwarya's father
 Rani as Aishwarya's mother
 Brahmanandam as Viswanath
 Dharmavarapu Subrahmanyam
 MS Narayana
 Ali as Bhairava
 Kovai Sarala as Ramanamma, Sai's mother
 Chandra Mohan as Rao, Sai's father
 Jaya Prakash Reddy
 Venu Madhav as Mitravinda
 Supreeth as Mallikharjun
 Khayyum as Khayyum, Sai's friend
 Shankar Melkote as Doctor
 Gundu Sudarshan
 Master Bharath
 Sravan
 Anand
 Vamsi
 Chinna
 Kiranmayi
 Chaitanya

Soundtrack

Music of the film was launched at a function organized in Prasad Labs on the night of 11 September 2009.

Raghu Kunche composed the music. making his debut as a music director. He won the Nandi Special Jury Award for Music Director in the year 2009.

Awards
Raghu Kunche won Nandi Special Jury Award for Best Singer - "Enduke Ramanamma" Song

References

External links

See also
 Telugu films of 2009

2009 films
Telugu films remade in other languages
2000s Telugu-language films
Indian action comedy films
Films scored by Raghu Kunche
2009 action comedy films